Glen Bradley (born September 11, 1973) is a former member of the North Carolina House of Representatives. A Republican, he represented the 49th District of North Carolina for one term. Bradley previously served as a US Marine Corps Corporal/Intelligence Analyst from 1993-1997.

Biography
Bradley defeated Democrat John May in the general election held on November 2, 2010 with 51% of the vote. Bradley's election signaled a wide swing in the district, which had voted for former Democratic representative Lucy T. Allen 58%-41% over Keith Shearon in 2008.

In the House, Bradley filed bills to study whether or not the state should authorize an alternative currency, and to require the state to accept gold and silver as legal tender.

Bradley ran for the North Carolina Senate in 2012 but lost the Republican primary on May 8, 2012.  He finished in last place out of three candidates, getting about 14% of the vote, behind winner Chad Barefoot (46%) and second-place finisher Michael Schriver (40%).

In 2013, Bradley ran for Vice-Chair of the North Carolina Republican Party at the state convention (June 7–9, 2013). He lost to Joyce Krawiec, placing second in a four-person field.

Election history

References

External links

Republican Party members of the North Carolina House of Representatives
Living people
People from Youngsville, North Carolina
1973 births
21st-century American politicians